The 122nd Rajputana Infantry were an infantry regiment of the British Indian Army. The regiment traces their origins to 1818, when they were raised as the 2nd Battalion, 11th Regiment of Bombay Native Infantry.

The regiments first action was during the Boxer Rebellion, they also served in World War I

After World War I the Indian government reformed the army moving from single battalion regiments to multi battalion regiments. In 1922, the 122nd Rajputana Infantry became the 3rd (Prince of Wales's Own), 6th Rajputana Rifles. After independence they were one of the regiments allocated to the Indian Army.

Predecessor names
2nd Battalion, 11th Regiment of Bombay Native Infantry - 1818
22nd Bombay Native Infantry - 1824
22nd Bombay Infantry - 1885
122nd Rajputana Infantry - 1903
3rd Battalion 6th Rajputana Rifles -1921
3rd Battalion The Rajputana Rifles -1947

Commanding officers

Regimental War Memorial
A memorial to the Rajputana Rifles in the form of a marble Chhatri (canopy) was constructed in 1925 at Nasirabad after formation of Sixth Rajputana Rifle Group in 1921/22. This was to commemorate 2,058 of all ranks of the regiment who had been killed during World War I. The 20-foot high memorial is a Makrana marble dome supported by six pillars. Each pillar represented a battalion of the Rajputana Rifle Group and was engraved with the crest of the battalion. A complete roll of honour was buried beneath a central plaque on which was engraved 23 battle honours earned by the regiment during the war. The memorial was unveiled at Nasirabad on 28 January 1927 by Lieutenant General Sir John Shea, KCB, KCNG, DSO, the then Adjutant General in India.

References

Sources

Moberly, F.J. (1923). Official History of the War: Mesopotamia Campaign, Imperial War Museum. 

Singh, Colonel Dr Narendar  (2019) ''Third Battalion The Rajputana Rifles 'Waffadar Paltan' Volume 1 1818-1920 (New Delhi: Pentagon Press) 
Singh, Colonel Dr Narendar  (2020) ''Third Battalion The Rajputana Rifles 'Gods Own' Volume 2 1921-2018 (New Delhi: Pentagon Press) 

British Indian Army infantry regiments
Bombay Presidency
Military units and formations established in 1818
Military units and formations disestablished in 1922
Military units and formations of the Boxer Rebellion